Vicenzo Borgarello (9 May 1884, in Cambiano, Piedmont – 6 January 1969) was an Italian professional road bicycle racer.

Borgarello was born in Cambiano and died in Turin. He won in total four stages in the Giro d'Italia and two stages in the Tour de France. He was leading the classification in the 1912 Tour de France for one day.

Major results

1910
Giro del Piemonte
1911
Giro d'Italia:
Winner stage 2
1912
Giro d'Italia:
Winner stages 2, 7 and 9
Tour de France:
Winner stages 8 and 14

External links 

Official Tour de France results for Vicenzo Borgarello

1884 births
1969 deaths
Sportspeople from the Metropolitan City of Turin
Italian male cyclists
Italian Tour de France stage winners
Cyclists from Piedmont